El Camino Angosto is a census-designated place (CDP) in Cameron County, Texas, United States. The population was 253 at the 2010 census. It is part of the Brownsville–Harlingen Metropolitan Statistical Area.

Geography
El Camino Angosto is located in west-central Cameron County at  (26.112751, -97.642585). It is bordered to the north by the city of San Benito.

Demographics
As of the census of 2000, there were 254 people, 64 households, and 57 families residing in the CDP. The population density was 683.8 people per square mile (265.1/km2). There were 70 housing units at an average density of 188.5/sq mi (73.0/km2). The racial makeup of the CDP was 23.23% White, 76.77% from other races. Hispanic or Latino of any race were 99.21% of the population.

There were 64 households, out of which 50.0% had children under the age of 18 living with them, 75.0% were married couples living together, 9.4% had a female householder with no husband present, and 10.9% were non-families. 7.8% of all households were made up of individuals, and 4.7% had someone living alone who was 65 years of age or older. The average household size was 3.97 and the average family size was 4.19.

In the CDP, the population was spread out, with 35.0% under the age of 18, 9.4% from 18 to 24, 31.9% from 25 to 44, 15.4% from 45 to 64, and 8.3% who were 65 years of age or older. The median age was 28 years. For every 100 females, there were 100.0 males. For every 100 females age 18 and over, there were 89.7 males.

The median income for a household in the CDP was $26,053, and the median income for a family was $26,645. Males had a median income of $26,579 versus $8,795 for females. The per capita income for the CDP was $8,749. About 28.1% of families and 44.7% of the population were below the poverty line, including 57.5% of those under the age of eighteen and 25.8% of those 65 or over.

Education
El Camino Angosto is served by the San Benito Consolidated Independent School District.

In addition, South Texas Independent School District operates magnet schools that serve the community.

References

Census-designated places in Cameron County, Texas
Census-designated places in Texas